Hellinsia montezerpae is a moth of the family Pterophoridae. It is found in Venezuela.

The forewings are greyish-brown with dark brown fringes. The hindwings and their fringes are lighter.

References

Moths described in 2001
montezerpae
Moths of South America
Endemic fauna of Venezuela